Valérie Reggel (born 3 January 1987) is a Swiss athlete who specialises in the heptathlon. She competed in the heptathlon event at the 2015 World Championships in Athletics in Beijing, China.

Her personal bests in the combined events are 6091 points in the heptathlon (Zürich 2014) and 3925 points in the pentathlon (Magglingen 2007).

Competition record

Personal bests
Outdoor
100 metres – 12.41 (+1.5 m/s) (Bern 2005)
200 metres – 24.30 (+2.0 m/s) (Götzis 2014)
400 metres – 55.99 (Langenthal 2013)
800 metres – 2:12.68 (Zürich 2014)
100 metres hurdles – 13.69 (Zug 2015)
400 metres hurdles – 58.89 (Luzern 2013)
High jump – 1.70 (Zürich 2014)
Long jump – 6.14 (-0.3 m/s) (Zürich 2014)
Triple jump – 11.97 (-0.9 m/s) (Basel 2013)
Shot put – 14.06 (Götzis 2015)
Javelin throw – 44.76 (Götzis 2015)
Heptathlon – 6091 (Zürich 2014)
Indoor
200 metres – 25.47 (Magglingen 2006)
Pentathlon – 3925 (Magglingen 2007)
800 metres – 2:30.43 (St. Gallen 2010)
60 metres hurdles – 8.60 (Magglingen 2014)
High jump – 1.63 (St. Gallen 2010)
Long jump – 5.85 (Magglingen 2006)
Triple jump – 12.15 (St. Gallen 2008)
Shot put – 13.19 (Dornbirn 2014)

References

External links
 

1987 births
Living people
Swiss heptathletes
Swiss sportswomen
World Athletics Championships athletes for Switzerland
Place of birth missing (living people)
European Games competitors for Switzerland
Athletes (track and field) at the 2019 European Games
21st-century Swiss women